Altissimo (Italian, 'very high', feminine form: altissima) is the uppermost register on woodwind instruments.

Altissimo may also refer to:

 Altissimo (album), by Gary Bartz, Lee Konitz, Jackie McLean and Charlie Mariano, 1973
 Altissimo, Veneto, a place in Italy
 Monte Altissimo, a mountain in the Bergamasque Prealps, Italy
 Cristofano dell'Altissimo (c. 1525–1605), an Italian painter
 Renato Altissimo (1940–2015), an Italian politician
 in altissimo, singing above the note F

See also

 in alt, singing in the octave above the treble staff, G to F